Joselo (1936–2013) was a Venezuelan actor and comedian.

Joselo may also refer to:

Joselo Díaz (born 1980), Dominican baseball player
Joselo Rangel, musician in Café Tacuba